George Nooks,  Prince Mohamed, Prince Mohammed, or George Knooks (born c. 1958 in Kingston, Jamaica) is a reggae singer who initially found fame as a deejay.

Biography
Nooks started his musical career in the youth choir at his church, and moved on to perform at school concerts and talent shows. After first recording professionally in 1974, Nooks first found success performing under the name Prince Mohamed, as a deejay on discomix tracks for producer Joe Gibbs, notably on Dennis Brown's 1978 hit "Money in my Pocket", and "How Could I Leave", as well as "Light Up Your Spliff" for producer Prince Tony Robinson. He moved on to work with other producers such as Alvin Ranglin and Bunny Riley. His first album, a joint effort with General Echo, People Are You Ready, was released on the United Artists subsidiary Ballistic in 1978. This was followed by African Roots, recorded the following year for producer Linval Thompson. He had a hit in Jamaica with "Forty Legs Dread", and the increasing violence in Kingston prompted Nooks to record a version of Little Roy's "Tribal War", now singing rather than deejaying, and released under his real name, which he followed with a cover version of Errol Dunkley's "Darling Ooh". Nooks would subsequently concentrate on his singing, releasing the Today album in 1981, although he reverted to Prince Mohamed in 1982 for an album with June Lodge. His singing gained comparisons with Dennis Brown, who he would later pay tribute to with a double album of Brown covers.

His 1996 single "Real Man" reached number 55 on the Billboard R&B Singles Sales chart. In 1997 Nooks released his first album in 15 years, a self-titled collection resulting in three Tamika Reggae Music awards, but since 1997 he has been quite prolific, releasing a string of solo albums, as well as albums shared with Glen Washington, Roland Burrell, Singing Melody and Lukie D. Since the death of his grandmother in 2001, Nooks has primarily recorded gospel material.

His 2016 album Ride Out Your Storm reached number 4 on the Billboard Reggae Albums chart, and number 22 on the Gospel chart.

Nooks also works as a producer, and has run his own Total Records label since the early 1990s.

Albums

Prince Mohamed
People Are You Ready (1978) Ballistic (with General Echo)
African Roots (1979) Burning Rockers
No One Remember Africa (1979) GG's
Bubbling Techniques
Inna Him Head (1980) Joe Gibbs
Someone Loves You Honey (1982) Joe Gibbs/Ariola (June Lodge featuring Prince Mohamed)

George Nooks
Today (1981) Jimpy's
One of a Kind (1990), Mr. Doo
George Nooks (1997) Correct
This One's For You (1999) VP
Standing By (2001) VP
Damage (2001) Charm
Toe 2 Toe vol. 2 (2002) Jet Star (George Nooks & Glen Washington)
Better Days (2002) Jet Star
Created by the Father (2002) Cactus (with Roland Burrell)
No Power on Earth (2002) Jet Star
Singers (2003) Brick Wall (Singing Melody, Lukie D, and George Nooks)
Don't Give Up (2004) Jet Star
Jet Star Reggae Max (2004) Jet Star
One 2 One Volume 2 (2004) High Power Music, VP Records, (with Gregory Isaacs)
Giving Thanks (2005)
George Nooks Sings Dennis Brown: The Voice Lives On (2006)
Come a Long Way (2006) Cousins
So Excited (2007) Tafari
Diamond Series (2008) Tad's/Total
Broken Vessel (2012), Tad's International
Ride Out Your Storm (2016), Tad's International
For You (2018), VP

DVDs
God is Standing By (2005) Jet Star (with Sanchez)

References

External links
George Nooks on Myspace
George Nooks at Roots Archives
Rootsdub discography
George Nooks at ReggaeID

Jamaican reggae musicians
Musicians from Kingston, Jamaica
Living people
Year of birth missing (living people)
VP Records artists